The ATB Tour of Alberta was a Canadian bicycle stage race, which raced across the province of Alberta. It was sanctioned by Union Cycliste Internationale (UCI) and was part of the UCI America Tour.  It was classified as a 2.1 race, making it one of the highest rated races on the tour. The inaugural tour featured a prologue and five stages, and was held September 3–8, 2013.

On February 15, 2018 the Alberta Peloton Association announced that the event was being cancelled.

History
The Tour of Alberta was the brainchild of former professional cyclist Alex Steida, who was the first North American cyclist to wear the Yellow Jersey in the Tour de France. After moving to Edmonton, Steida felt that the local geography and the ability of residents to "roll up their sleeves and get stuff done" made the province an ideal place for a multi-stage race and he spent nearly a decade promoting the idea. The idea began to take shape in 2012 when proponents secured support from the Rural Alberta Development Fund, which believed such a race could promote the province to a world audience. The proposed race was sanctioned by UCI in late 2012 and given a 2.1 classification, making it one of the highest rated events on the UCI America Tour.

Classifications
The race had six individual classifications, and the leader in each wore a special jersey in similar fashion to the Tour de France:
 Yellow jersey: General classification (overall leader)
 Green jersey: Sprint classification
 Polka dot jersey: Mountains classification
 White jersey: Young rider classification
 Red jersey: Canadian rider classification
 Blue jersey: Most aggressive rider

Results

General classification

Other classifications

References

External links

 
Cycle races in Canada
UCI America Tour races
2013 establishments in Alberta
Recurring sporting events established in 2013
2018 disestablishments in Alberta
Recurring sporting events disestablished in 2018